Valvaithankoshtam is a panchayat town in Kanniyakumari district in the Indian state of Tamil Nadu.

Demographics
 India census, Valvaithankoshtam had a population of 16,698. Males constitute 50% of the population and females 50%. Valvaithankoshtam has an average literacy rate of 79%, higher than the national average of 59.5%: male literacy is 81%, and female literacy is 78%. In Valvaithankoshtam, 11% of the population is under 6 years of age.

References

Cities and towns in Kanyakumari district